It's About Pride is the tenth album by American southern rock band Outlaws, released on September 25, 2012. (See 2012 in music).

Track listing
"Tomorrow's Another Night" (H. Paul) – 4:18
"Hidin' Out in Tennessee" (H. Paul, B. Crain) – 4:07
"It's About Pride" (H. Paul) – 7:10
"Born To Be Bad" (B. Crain, H. Paul) – 5:19
"Last Ghost Town" (B. Crain) – 3:34
"Nothin' Main About Main Street" (H. Paul, B. Crain, T. Hambridge) – 5:35
"The Flame" (B. Crain, H. Paul, C. Anderson) – 4:29
"Trail of Tears" (C. Anderson) – 3:47
"Right Where I Belong" (B. Crain, H. Paul, D. Robbins) – 4:15
"Alex's Song" (H. Paul, B. Crain) – 3:38
"Trouble Rides A Fast Horse" (H. Paul, B. Crain, M. Curb) – 5:22
"So Long" (H. Paul) – 5:52

Personnel
Henry Paul – guitars, lead vocals
Monte Yoho – drums
Billy Crain – guitars, harmony vocals
Chris Anderson – guitars, lead and harmony vocals
Randy Threet – bass, lead and harmony vocals
Dave Robbins – keyboards, harmony vocals

Additional Musicians
Joe Lala – percussion

Production
Producers: Michael Bush & Henry Paul
Engineers: Jesse Poe, Michael Bush
Mixing: Michael Bush
Design: Good & Evil Design
Photo: John Gellman

References

2012 albums